Kapil Hari Paranjape is an Indian mathematician specializing in algebraic geometry. He is a Professor of Mathematics at the Indian Institute of Science Education and Research, Mohali.

Biography
He was born in Mumbai, Maharashtra near the Kabootar Khana in Dadar but grew up in New Delhi. He completed his schooling from Sardar Patel Vidyalaya in 1977. He then joined Indian Institute of Technology Kanpur where he pursued a five-years integrated Master’s programme in Mathematics and graduated in 1982. He was awarded the General Proficiency Prize for Mathematics from IIT Kanpur (1982).

He joined School of Mathematics, Tata Institute of Fundamental Research as was awarded his PhD in Mathematics in 1992.

Paranjape is also involved in the promotion of Linux and GNU and writes a blog Mast Kalandar.

Career
He worked as a Reader at TIFR from 1993-1998. During this he also held various visiting positions at
University of Chicago, University of Paris-Sud and University of Warwick. He was appointed as Professor at the Theoretical Statistics and Mathematics Unit of the Indian Statistical Institute, Bangalore. He moved to Institute of Mathematical Sciences, Chennai in 1996. Between 2001 and 2009 he has held visiting positions at California Institute of Technology. Since 2009 he is a professor of Mathematics at Indian Institute of Science Education and Research, Mohali.

Awards and honors
He was awarded the Shanti Swarup Bhatnagar Prize for Science and Technology in 2005, the highest science award in India,  in the mathematical sciences category. His citation read "Dr Paranjape has made outstanding contributions in the field of algebraic geometry, especially the theory of algebraic cycles. He has made highly significant contributions in connecting Hodge Theory to the study of Chow Groups. He has also established deep relations between Calabi-Yau varieties and modular forms.". He is also a recipient of various other honors, among them are

Fellowship of Indian Academy of Sciences Bangalore, 1997
Fellowship of National Academy of Sciences Allahabad, 1999
Associate of the ICTP, Trieste, 1999-2001
B. M. Birla award for young scientists, 1999
DST Swarnajayanti Grant, 2001
NBHM National Lecturer, India, 2004-2005
Debian Developer, 2007
Fellowship of Indian National Science Academy, New Delhi, 2009
J C Bose National Fellowship, 2010
Fellowship of The World Academy of Sciences (TWAS), 2019

References

External links
 

People from Sahibzada Ajit Singh Nagar district
Fellows of the Indian National Science Academy
20th-century Indian mathematicians
IIT Kanpur alumni
21st-century Indian mathematicians
TWAS fellows
Recipients of the Shanti Swarup Bhatnagar Award in Mathematical Science